David Peter S. Witts (born 30 June 1991) is a British actor and model, best known for his portrayal of Joey Branning in the long-running British television soap opera, EastEnders, in which he appeared from 2012 to 2013.

Early life
Witts attended Southend High School for Boys, where he first discovered his passion for acting. For a number of years, he trained with the National Youth Music Theatre and the National Youth Theatre of Great Britain. Following a short period of working as a barman, Witts appeared in numerous theatre productions, including Wild Boyz, The Wizard of Oz and Snow White during 2011 and 2012.

Career

2012–13: EastEnders
In May 2012, Digital Spy reported that Witts had been cast to play Derek Branning's son, Joey Branning, in EastEnders. Of his arrival to the series, Witts commented, "I am delighted to be joining EastEnders after being a fan for so many years. Joining the Branning family couldn't have come at a better time, especially after the recent British Soap Awards wins." EastEnders''' executive producer, Lorraine Newman said, "Joey is a fantastic addition to the Brannings and after an explosive entrance onto the Square, he is set to break a few hearts as he campaigns to bring Derek down."

In October 2013 it was reported that he had decided to leave EastEnders.  His final scenes were aired on 26 December 2013.

2014–present: Theatre, Recovery Road and Manhunt
In early 2014 Witts starred as Link Larkin in a production of Hairspray at the Curve in Leicester.

He appeared in the pantomime Aladdin at the New Theatre, Hull over the Christmas/New Year period of 2014/15.

In March 2015, it was announced that Witts would star in the new American TV series Recovery Road, as Craig, with the series beginning on 25 January 2016 on Freeform. In May 2016, it was announced that the show had been cancelled.

In May 2018, it was announced that Witts would making his West End debut in the hit musical Wicked, replacing Bradley Jaden as Fiyero from 23 July 2018. Witts left Wicked on 20 July 2019 and was replaced by Alistair Brammer.

In March 2019, Witts appeared in an episode of the BBC daytime soap Doctors.

Witts appeared in the pantomime Cinderella at the Theatre Royal, Norwich over the Christmas/New Year period of 2019/20.

In 2021, Witts appeared in the second series of Manhunt'' alongside Martin Clunes. Witts played DC Adam Spier for four episodes.

Filmography

Awards and nominations

References

1991 births
Living people
People from Southend-on-Sea
Male actors from Essex
People educated at Southend High School for Boys
English male stage actors
English male soap opera actors
National Youth Theatre members